Española Public School District #55 (EPSD) or Española Public Schools (EPS) is a school district based in Española, New Mexico, USA. It includes sections of Rio Arriba County and Santa Fe County.

In the year 2000 the district had a total of 16 schools with approximately 6,103 students. In the 2011–2012 school year, the district had an enrollment of 4,970. Currently there are 10 elementary schools,a kindergarten center, a middle school, and a high school.

History
In 2016 Bobbie Gutierrez resigned as superintendent, and at that time Eric Martinez became the superintendent.

The New Mexico Public Education Department criticized Martinez, who left in 2017 and was paid $130,000 and leave money as part of a buyout. That year the school board members changed in composition to a significant degree.

Service area
In addition to Española, the district serves:
Sections of Rio Arriba County, including: Abiquiu, Alcalde, Canova, Chamita, Chili, Dixon, El Duende, Hernandez, La Mesilla, La Villita, Los Luceros, Lyden, Medanales, Ohkay Owingeh, Pueblito, San Jose, Santa Clara Pueblo, Velarde, and a portion of Ojo Sarco
Sections of Santa Fe County, including Chimayo, La Puebla, Rio Chiquito, Santa Cruz, Sombrillo, and a portion of El Valle de Arroyo Seco

School Board

List of schools

Secondary schools
 Española Valley High School
 Carlos F. Vigil Middle School

Elementary schools
 Abiquiu Elementary
 Alcalde Elementary
 Chimayo Elementary
 Dixon Elementary
 Eutimio "Tim" Salazar, III (Fairview) Elementary
 Hernandez Elementary
 James H. Rodriguez (Española) Elementary
 San Juan Elementary
 Tony E. Quintana (Sombrillo) Elementary
 Velarde Elementary (scheduled for closing in 2015-2016 SY)

Kindergarten Centers
 Los Niños Kindergarten

Gallery

Notes

References

 Española Public School District

Education in Rio Arriba County, New Mexico
Education in Santa Fe County, New Mexico
School districts in New Mexico
Española, New Mexico
School districts established in 1920